The Waldenburg railway (WB) is a narrow-gauge light rail system in the canton of Basel-Landschaft, Switzerland. It connects to SBB train services in Liestal railway station. The line was temporarily closed between April 2021 and December 2022 for modernisation and conversion to metre gauge.

It was opened on 1 November 1880 and was operated by steam-hauled trains until 1953, when electric operation began. New rolling stock was introduced from 1985. The 750 mm gauge rolling stock was sold for further service on the Čierny Hron Railway in Slovakia. 

Since 2022 the line has used used ten metre-gauge seven-car Tramlink vehicles built by Stadler Rail. They are painted in the standard yellow Baselland Transport (BLT) livery.

History

A concession was granted by the canton of Basel-Landschaft on 18 June 1871 for the construction of a narrow gauge railway from Liestal to Waldenburg and eventually further to Langenbruck. In 1873, the concession was altered to give the Swiss Central Railway the commission to build the railway. For financial reasons in 1876 the Swiss Central Railway requested a deadline extension. On 25 November 1879, the Waldenburgerbahn was founded as a separate company and took over the concession for the railway from Liestal to Waldenburg.

After only eight months' construction, the railway opened on 30 October 1880. Seats were provided in second- and third-class carriages. In 1881, the railway served eight stations with four journeys in each direction. The fastest journey over the whole 13 km line took 56 minutes.

In 1909, a committee made an application for the construction of and operation of an electric narrow-gauge railway from Waldenburg through Langenbruck to Balsthal, with a connection from St.Wolfgang to Mümliswil. The outbreak of World War I stopped plans for the extension of the line, and a 1912 proposal to electrify the line and regauge it to  gauge.

On 26 October 1953, electric operation of the railway began, using 1500 V DC. New rolling stock was acquired for this.

The pre-2021 rolling stock, consisting of seven railcars and 10 control cars was acquired between 1986 and 1993, replacing the 1953 stock.

In late 2015, the government of Basel-Landschaft canton approved a plan to convert the line from 750 mm gauge to meter gauge in 2023. This will involve new passing loops and extensive reconstruction at Liestal and Waldenburg. The first step was the remodelling of Talhaus station (finished in 2018). Fully automatic operation is also being contemplated. Waldenburgerbahn AG merged into Baselland Transport in 2016. In 2019 BLT ordered ten new light rail vehicles for use on the line after the conversion to metre gauge.

The 1980s era rolling stock was sold to Čierny Hron Railway in Slovakia. In addition to regauging the line, the following improvements were made:

 rebuilding the terminus station at 
 several new passing tracks

Operation
The line was originally built to  gauge, and is electrified at 1500 V DC. For most of its route, the line takes the form of a single-track roadside electric tramway. There are 11 intermediate stops, and six passing loops. In December 2022, the line was reopened as a metre gauge railway.

The journey over the whole line takes around 24 minutes. The line forms part of the  Tarifverbund Nordwestschweiz (TNW) common fare network, and is numbered 19 in that network's publicity, but this number is not displayed on the vehicles. The line runs a half-hourly service throughout the day, with additional trains during peak hours. Tourist services were formerly operated from spring to autumn by the only operating steam locomotive on the line, 1902-built Number 5 Gédéon Thommen. With the forthcoming conversion of the line to metre gauge, the "Thommen" was retired in September 2018 and is now in a new static display at Talhaus station

Rolling stock

Current rolling stock (since 2022)

Ten metre-gauge seven-section articulated "Tramlink" vehicles were built specially for the line by Stadler Rail. They are painted in the standard yellow Baselland Transport (BLT) livery.

Former rolling stock (until April 2021)

The rolling stock built between 1985 and 1993 has been sold for further service on the Čierny Hron Railway in Slovakia.

Older former rolling stock

See also
 Rail transport in Switzerland
 History of rail transport in Switzerland

References

External links
 
 Official website 

Passenger rail transport in Switzerland
Railway lines in Switzerland
Railway lines opened in 1880
Transport in Basel-Landschaft
750 mm gauge railways in Switzerland
1500 V DC railway electrification
Baselland Transport lines